Marian Phillip Abi Habib (born 13 May 1973), known as Nour, is a Lebanese actress who performs in Egypt.

Career 
Born in Roumieh, Nour began her career as an advertisement model. Her first role in cinema was in the Egyptian movie of Short w Fanella w Cap. She also acted in Ezay Tekhalley al Banat Tehabak, Zarf Tarek, Matab Sena'ee and al-Rahina (The Hostage). She also starred in the Egyptian TV series of al-Ameel 1001 (Agent 1001). In 2014, she recommenced acting after a five-year break in Saraya Abdeen.

Personal life 
In 2008, Nour married Youssef Antaki, with whom she has two children, Leonardo and Lydia.

Her work

Movies

TV series 

–
2021
Zel Ragel
El Prince

References

External links 
 

1973 births
Living people
Lebanese film actresses
Lebanese television actresses
Lebanese Christians
Lebanese female models
People from Matn District
Lebanese University alumni